Wallace Junction is a ghost town in Taylor Township, Owen County, in the U.S. state of Indiana.

Geography

References

Ghost towns in Indiana